Unthank is a collection of houses in Stanhope in County Durham, England. Unthank can be found just over Stanhope Ford and at the bottom of Softley Bank. It consists of Unthank Mill, Unthank Hall, Unthank Farm and Unthank Cottage, now called the Railway Cottage. Unthank Mill backs onto Unthank Park which is a popular caravan park, and also host to Stanhope's agricultural shows and other local events.

See also
Unthank, North Yorkshire

References

Hamlets in County Durham
Stanhope, County Durham